Tegenaria rhodiensis (syn.: Cicurina rhodiensis) is a spider species found in Rhodes.

See also 
 List of Dictynidae species

References

External links 

Dictynidae
Spiders of Europe
Spiders described in 1948